During the 2014–15 season, Bury competed in the fourth tier of English football, Football League Two.

Match details

Pre-season

League Two

League table

Matches
The fixtures for the 2014–15 season were announced on 18 June 2014 at 9am.

FA Cup

The draw for the first round of the FA Cup was made on 27 October 2014.

League Cup

The draw for the first round was made on 17 June 2014 at 10am. Bury were drawn away to Bolton Wanderers.

Football League Trophy

Transfers

In

Out

Loans in

Loans out

References

Bury F.C. seasons
Bury